Park Hill High School is one of two high schools in the Park Hill School District, in Kansas City. The school is located in northern Kansas City, in Platte County.

Park Hill's teams are called the Trojans, and its colours are red and white. Park Hill High School had an enrollment of 1,919 students in 2016-2017.

History
The original school building opened in 1952 and the current building opened in 1967.  The original building became Park Hill Junior High and later Plaza Middle School, the district's 6th grade school. Plaza is now a 6-8 grade middle school.

In the late 1990s a new gymnasium was built on the west side of the building to replace the original gym, which is now used primarily for practices and school dances. Around this same time, an auditorium was also built adjacent to the new gym.

Since 1998, Park Hill has won five wrestling state championships, two volleyball state championships, and the 2003 football state championship, as well as a cheerleading state championship in 2014. The Lady Trojans won the 2018 girls soccer state championship.

Facilities 
The school has a football complex, gymnasium, and auditorium. The Park Hill Aquatic Center is located next to the football complex. It houses the Park Hill and Park Hill South boys' and girls' swim teams.

Notable alumni
Andy Ashby, former major league baseball player
Raymond Lee (Class of 2011), professional soccer player, (Pittsburgh Riverhounds SC)
Wes Scantlin (Class of 1990), musician and lead vocalist/rhythm guitarist of the Kansas City-born band Puddle of Mudd
Landry Shamet (Class of 2015), professional basketball player, (Phoenix Suns)
Chris Nilsen, 6x NCAA Division I First Team All-American, and a 3x NCAA Track and field pole vault champion
Johnny Eblen (Class of 2010), professional mixed martial artist currently signed to Bellator MMA, where he is the 8th Bellator Middleweight Champion.

References

External links
Park Hill High School website

Educational institutions established in 1952
School buildings completed in 1967
High schools in Platte County, Missouri
Public high schools in Missouri
1952 establishments in Missouri